Two and One-Half Mile Village is an Indian settlement in southeast Yukon, Canada. The settlement is recognized as a census subdivision by Statistics Canada.

Demographics 

In the 2011 Census, Statistics Canada originally reported that Two and One-Half Mile Village had a population of 0 living in 0 dwellings, a decrease from its 2006 population of 95. Statistics Canada subsequently amended the 2011 census results to a population of 125 living in 44 of its 44 total dwellings, a 31.6% change from 2006.

See also 
List of communities in Yukon

References 

Indian settlements in Yukon